The First Presbyterian Church of Pittsburgh is an active congregation in Pittsburgh, Pennsylvania, USA. The church structure in use today was completed in 1905.

Architecture 
The church structure, designed by architect Theophilus Parsons Chandler, was built in 1905 in the neo-Gothic (Gothic-revival) style. 13 of the 253 stained-glass windows were hand-painted by Tiffany Studios. The  main worship hall also feature a pair of 30 foot, two-ton oak doors, still in operation, which can be rolled open to the choir.

History 

An exact date for the formation of the congregation may never be known. There is evidence going back as far as 1783 in the account of Mr. John Wilkins:. . . I arrived in Pittsburgh November 10 . . . it seemed odd to me that the Presbyterian ministers were afraid to come to the place . . . something ought to be done toward establishing a Presbyterian church in this place and encourage it. After some time a Rev. Samuel Barr came to town and preached a few sermons. We seemed pleased with him and made him an offer, which he accepted, and was ordained in what is now called the First Presbyterian congregation in Pittsburgh.A bill was passed in the Legislative Assembly at Philadelphia to incorporate a Presbyterian Congregation in Pittsburgh on 29 September 1787.

Images

References 

Historic buildings and structures in the United States
Churches in Pittsburgh
Presbyterian churches in Pennsylvania
Churches completed in 1905
1905 establishments in Pennsylvania